Netherlands competed at the 1988 Winter Paralympics in Innsbruck, Austria. The team included 8 athletes, 6 men and 2 women. Competitors from Netherlands won 0 medals to finish 16th in the medal table.

Medalists

No medals were won during these Paralympic games.

Alpine skiing

 Wiel Bouten
 Karel Hanse

Cross-country skiing

 Tineke Hekman
 Jan Visser

Ice Sledge Speed Racing

 Johan Balder
 Willem Hofma
 Gerda Lampers
 Arthur Overtoom

See also
Netherlands at the Paralympics
Netherlands at the 1988 Winter Olympics

References

External links
International Paralympic Committee official website

Nations at the 1988 Winter Paralympics
1988
Summer Paralympics